Calgary Stampede rodeo champions have won their respective events in one of the largest rodeos in the world; the rodeo is the heart of the Calgary Stampede.  With a prize of $50,000 to the winner of each major discipline, it offers one of the richest payouts in rodeo competition.  In Canada, the Calgary Stampede rodeo is broadcast nationally by the Canadian Broadcasting Corporation (CBC) on its main network, as well as on Sportsnet One. In the United States, the rodeo is televised live on The Cowboy Channel and live-streamed on the subscription-based The Cowboy Channel Plus application.  

There are six major disciplines – bull riding, barrel racing, steer wrestling, tie down roping, saddle bronc and bareback riding – and four novice events – junior steer riding, novice bareback, novice saddle bronc and wild pony racing.  Each event is organized as its own tournament, and the cowboys and girls are divided into two pools. The first pool competes each night for the first four nights, and the second each night for four nights following. The top four in each pool advance to the Sunday final, and the remainder compete on Saturday for a wild card spot in the final. The competitor with the best time or score on Sunday wins the $50,000 grand prize. Team roping was added in 2022. However, unlike the other rodeo events, it was limited to one day and the competition was called the Rocky Mountain Cup. It took place at the Nutrien Western Event Centre and there were 30 teams at the event. The top four advanced to the final to determine the champion team, which would ultimately win $12,500 per member. 

All livestock for the rodeo events come from the  Stampede Ranch located near the town of Hanna. The ranch was created in 1961 as a means of improving the quality of bucking horses and bulls and to guarantee supply.  The first of its kind in North America, the Stampede Ranch operates a breeding program that produces some of the top rodeo stock in the world and supplies rodeos throughout southern Alberta, and as far south as Las Vegas, Nevada for the National Finals Rodeo.

Past champions

Saddle bronc riding
2022 Logan Hay, Wildwood, AB
2021 Brody Cress, Hillsdale, WY
2019 Rusty Wright, Milford, UT
2018 Ryder Wright, Milford, UT
2017 Zeke Thurston, Big Valley, AB
2016 Zeke Thurston, Big Valley, AB
2015 Zeke Thurston.  Big Valley, AB
2014 Dustin Flundra, Pincher Creek, AB
2013 Cort Scheer, Elsmere, NE
2012 Wade Sundell, Boxholm, IA
2011 Chad Ferley, Oelrichs, SD
2010 Wade Sundell, Boxholm, IA
2009 Taos Muncy, Corona, NM
2008 Cody Wright, Milford, UT
2007 Cody DeMoss, Heflin, LA
2006 Cody Wright, Millford, UT
2005 Rod Hay, Wildwood, AB
2004 Dan Mortensen, Billings, MT
2003 Rod Warren, Valleyview, AB
2002 Rod Hay, Wildwood, AB
2001 Ross Kreutzer, Maple Creek, SK
2000 Dan Mortensen, Billings, MT
1999 Rod Hay, Mayerthorpe, AB
1998 Denny Hay, Mayerthorpe, AB
1997 Steve Dollarhide, Wikieup, AZ
1996 Billy Etbauer, Ree Heights, SD
1995 Glen O’Neill, Kempsey, NSW, Australia
1994 Rod Hay, Mayerthorpe, AB
1993 Kent Cooper, Albion, ID
1992 Rod Warren, Valleyview, AB
1991 Dwayne Pillman, Wainwright, AB
1990 Duane Daines, Innisfail, AB
Source:

Bareback riding
2022 Rocker Steiner, Weatherford, TX
2021 Tim O’Connell, Zwingle, IA
2019 Tanner Aus, Granite Falls, MN
2018 Richie Champion, Dublin, TX
2017 Richie Champion, Dublin, TX
2016 Steven Peebles, Redmond, OR
2015 Clint Laye, Cadogan, AB
2014 Kaycee Feild, Elk Ridge, UT
2013 Caleb Bennet, Morgan UT
2012 Kaycee Feild, Elk Ridge, UT
2011 Clint Cannon, Waller, TX
2010 Will Lowe, Canyon, TX
2009 Will Lowe, Canyon, TX
2008 Will Lowe, Canyon, TX
2007 Davey Shields Jr., Bashaw, AB
2006 Davey Shields Jr., Bashaw, AB
2005 Davey Shields Jr., Bashaw, AB
2004 Cody DeMers, Boulder, MT
2003 Jason Delguercio, Strathmore, AB
2002 Cody Jessee, John Day, OR
2001 Chuck Logue, New Braunfels, TX
2000 James Boudreaux, Cuero, TX
1999 Chris Harris, Arlington, TX
1998 Roger Lacasse, Edmonton, AB
1997 Shawn Vant, Millet, AB
1996 Davey Shields Jr., Hanna, AB
1995 Darrell Cholach, Okotoks, AB
1994 Brian Hawk, Azle, TX
1993 Marvin Garrett, Belle Fouche, SD
1992 Bob Logue, Cumby, Texas
1991 Billy Laye, Bragg Creek, AB
1990 Deb Greenough, Fromberg, MT
Source:

Bull riding
2022 Shane Proctor, Grand Coulee, WA/Dakota Buttar, Eatonia, SK (tie)
2021 Jordan Hansen, Amisk, AB
2019 Sage Steele Kimzey, Strong City, OK
2018 Marcos Gloria, Edmonton, AB
2017 Sage Kimzey, Strong City, OK
2016 Cody Teel, Kountze, TX
2015 Sage Kimzey, Strong City, OK
2014 Scott Schiffner, Strathmore, AB
2013 J. B. Mauney, Mooresville, NC
2012 Chad Besplug, Claresholm, AB
2011 Shane Proctor, Mooresville, NC
2010 Douglas Duncan, Alvin, TX         
2009 J.B. Mauney, Mooresville, NC
2008 Mike Lee, Decatur, TX
2007 Brian Canter, Randleman, NC
2006 Ross Coleman, Molalla, OR
2005 Chris Hansen, Barrhead, AB
2004 Robert Bowers, Brooks, AB
2003 Justin Volz, Charlie Lake, BC
2002 Justin Volz, Charlie Lake, BC
2001 Scott Schiffner, Stettler, AB
2000 Marty Broderson, Vauxhall, AB
1999 Jason McDonald, Separ, NM
1998 Ty Murray, Stephenville, TX
1997 J.W. Hart, Marietta, OK
1996 Scott Breding, Edgar, MT
1995 Scott Breding, Edgar, MT
1994 Adriano Moraes, Cachoeira Paulista, SP, Brazil
1993 Jim Sharp, Kermit, TX
1992 Ted Nuce, Manteca, CA
1991 Troy Dunn, Mackay, QU,  Australia  
1990 Wacey Cathey, Big Spring, TX
Source:

Tie-down roping
2022 Caleb Smidt, Bellville, TX
2021 Cory Solomon, Prairie View, TX
2019 Caleb Smidt, Bellville, TX
2018 Tuf Cooper, Weatherford, TX
2017 Cory Solomon, Prairie View, TX
2016 Shane Hanchey, Sulphur, LA
2015 Timber Moore, Aubrey, TX
2014 Morgan Grant, Granton, ON
2013 Bradley Bynum, Sterling City, TX
2012 Cory Solomon, Prairieview, TX
2011 Tuf Cooper, Decatur, TX
2010 Matt Shiozawa, Chubbuck, ID
2009 Ryan Jarrett, Summerville, GA
2008 Jeff Chapman, Athens, TX
2007 Fred Whitfield, Hockley, TX
2006 Jerome Schneeberger, Ponca City, OK
2005 Alwin Bouchard, Scandia, AB
2004 Mike Johnson, Henryetta, OK
2003 Rickey Canton, Cleveland, TX
2002 Marty Becker, Manyberries, AB
2001 Fred Whitfield, Cypress, TX
2000 Blair Burk, Durant, OK
1999 Cliff Williamson, Madden, AB
1998 Cody Ohl, Orchard, TX
1997 Jeff Chapman, Athens, TX
1996 Roy Cooper, Childress, TX
1995 Shawn McMullan, Iraan, TX
1994 Joe Beaver, Huntsville, TX
1993 Fred Whitfield, Cypress, TX
1992 Kyle Kosoff, Ogden, UT
1991 Mark Simon, Florence, AZ
1990 Tod Slone, Canyon Lake, TX
Source:

Steer wrestling
2022 Will Lummus, Byhalia, MS
2021 Stetson Jorgensen, Blackfoot, ID
2019 Kyle Irwin, Robertsdale, AL
2018 Matt Reeves, Cross Plains, TX
2017 Tyler Waguespack, Gonzales, LA
2016 Seth Brockman, Wheatland, WY
2015 Trevor Knowles, Mt. Vernon, OR
2014 Trevor Knowles, Mt. Vernon, OR
2013 Wade Sumpter, Fowler, CO
2012 Trevor Knowles, Mt Vernon, OR
2011 Straws Milan, Cochrane, AB
2010 Lee Graves, Calgary, AB
2009 Trevor Knowles, Mt. Vernon, OR
2008 Wade Sumpter, Fowler, CO
2007 Shawn Greenfield, Lakeview, OR
2006 Curtis Cassidy, Donalda, AB
2005 Beau Franzen, Goodwell, OK
2004 Bryan Fields, Conroe, TX
2003 Jeff Corbello, Iowa, LA
2002 Bill Pace, Stephenville, TX
2001 Greg Cassidy, Donalda, AB
2000 Daryl Fisher, Pincher Creek, AB
1999 Mickey Gee, Wichita Falls, TX
1998 Jesse Peterson, Dillon, MT
1997 David Roy, Carseland, AB
1996 Todd Boggust, Paynton, SK
1995 Vince Walker, Brentwood, CA
1994 Steve Duhon, Opelousas, LA
1993 David Roy, Carseland, AB
1992 Joe Butterfield, Ponoka, AB
1991 Blaine Pederson, Amisk, AB
1990 Greg Cassidy, Donalda, AB
Source:

Barrel racing
2022 Kassie Mowry, Dublin, TX
2021 Bertina Olafson, Hudson Bay, SK
2019 Lisa Lockhart, Oelrichs, SD
2018 Hailey Kinsel, Cotulla, TX
2017 Tiany Schuster, Krum, TX
2016 Mary Burger, Pauls Valley, OK
2015 Lisa Lockhart, Oelrichs, SD
2014 Kaley Bass, Kissimmee, FL
2013 Jean Winters, Texline, TX
2012 Sue Smith, Blackfoot, ID
2011 Sydni Blanchard, Albuquerque, NM
2010 Savanah Reeves, Cross Planis, TX
2009 Tammy Key-Fischer, Ledbetter, TX
2008 Lindsay Sears, Nanton, AB
2007 Tana Poppino, Big Cabin, OK
2006 Joleen Seitz, Savona, BC
2005 Molly Powell, Stephenville, TX
2004 Debbie Renger, Okotoks, AB
2003 Charmayne James, Athens, TX
2002 Jill Besplug, Claresholm, AB
2001 Jill Besplug, Claresholm, AB
2000 Sherry Cervi, Marana, NM
1999 Rachael Myllymaki, Arlee, MT
1998 Cheyenne Wimberly, Stephenville, TX
1997 Kristie Peterson, Elbert, CO
1996 Sharon Smith, Dibble, OK
1995 Vana Beissinger, Lake Worth, FL
1994 Sharon Kobold, Big Horn, WY
1993 Sharon Kobold, Big Horn, WY
1992 Charmayne James, Rodman, Galt, CA
1991 Vana Beissinger, Lake Worth, FL
1990 Marlene Eddleman, Ramah, CO
Source:

Team roping
2022 Clint Summers, Lake City, FL/Ross Ashford, Lott, TX

References

Cowboy culture
Culture of Calgary
Calg
Recurring events established in 1912
Rodeo in Canada
1912 establishments in Alberta
Recurring sporting events established in 1912
Calgary
Sport in Calgary
Rodeo champions
Lists of sports awards